Matthew Stubbs is an American blues guitarist. He is best known as the lead guitarist for Charlie Musselwhite and GA-20.

Background
Stubbs has been Charlie Musselwhite's lead guitarist since 2008, and as of 2017 had been with the band for a decade. They toured all over the world.  Stubbs has also backed up and toured with such Blues giants as John Hammond, James Cotton, Junior Watson, and James Harman. With Musselwhite, he played on two live albums. Juke Joint Chapel was nominated for a Grammy in 2012. He released two albums under his own name, one with The Antiguas. He has won several Boston Music Awards. In 2018 he formed the band GA-20, their first single was released in 2019.

Career

The Antiguas
The group came about after Stubbs was writing some new material that differed from what he had done in the past. The music he was listening to was a lot of afrobeat, psych-rock, garage rock, and blues. They debuted with a self-titled album that sounded like a soundtrack to an action/spy film.
As of August 2017, Stubbs and his group, The Antiguas were playing free shows every week for Downbeat Mondays on Church St., Cambridge at The Sinclair's restaurant.

In August 2018, they were at Cambridge's Middle East Restaurant and Nightclub, opening for surf legend, Dick Dale.

GA-20
Along with fellow classic blues, R&B and early rock and roll lover Pat Faherty, Stubbs formed The GA-20 in the fall of 2017. They added drummer Chris Anzalone and the group became a trio. About a year after their formation, the scored a deal with Karma Chief Records. In early 2019, their single "Naggin’ on My Mind" was out. GA-20's debut album was released in October of 2019 on Karma Chief Records and debuted at number 2 on the Billboard Blues Charts.

Discography

References

External links
https://www.matthewstubbs.net

American blues guitarists
Living people
Year of birth missing (living people)